Minister for Tourism, Culture and Sport may refer to:

a former department of the Government of Ireland from 2010 to 2011, now renamed as Minister for Arts, Heritage and the Gaeltacht
a former department of the Scottish Government from 2003 to 2007